Xu Jie (1512–1578) courtesy name Zisheng, was a Chinese politician of the Ming dynasty.

Biography

Early life 
Xu Jie was born in Xuanping, Zhejiang in 1503, while his father was working there as the assistant county magistrate. Allegedly, when Xu was less than one year old, he fell into a well but lived on. While he was about five years old, he plummeted from a mountain, but his clothing snagged on a branch and saved him from death.

As Xu Jie grew older, he started to study. Once he was reading books in a claim haunted house, locals found him finished his lessons without any accidents, which impressed Xu Jie's father Xu Fu. Following the resignation of Xu Fu, Xu Jie went back to his home town, Huating. He studied beside a small lake called "Shao Hu"(), which became his first pseudonym.

When he grew up, he was described as a pale and handsome man of short stature. After his eighteenth birthday, Xu Jie gained his degree of Juren by ranked seventh in the provincial civil service examination held at Yingtian in the first year of Jiajing.

In 1523, Xu became s jinshi, ranked third in imperial examination. He began to work at the Hanlin Academy. When the Chief Grand Secretary, Zhang Cong, advised the Jiajing Emperor to replace Confucius's posthumous title "Wenxuan King" with "Extremely Sage Departed Teacher" and reform the ceremony for worship, Xu Jie showed himself to be resolutely opposed to that despite being summoned and upbraided by Zhang. To make matters worse, his opposition was deemed to be offensive to the emperor. Then the latter launched a scathing attack on him. Later, Xu submitted a memorial that was probably inappropriate for such an issue: "Your Majesty, your own sagacious counsels overwhelmingly exceeded my discernment." The emperor said such an action was ingratiating, and ordered the erection of a "Monument of the Sycophant" to ridicule him. What's more, Xu was exiled to Yanping, Fujian.

After a period of filial mourning for his mother, he returned to Beijing and was appointed the Jijiu (祭酒, [Libationer], the Principal of the Imperial University) of Guozijian . After that, he successively served as Vice Minister of Rites, Vice Minister of Personnel, and Minister of Rites, entering the Grand Secretariat in 1552.

Xu won prestige among the lower officials, since he seldom appeared condescending to them. When Altan Khan attacked Beijing, he appealed to the emperor to stay in the Forbidden City and convoke a council of senior officials. The emperor agreed and asked him how to respond to Altan Khan's demands. Xu proposed drawing out the negotiations in order to buy time to muster reinforcements; when the reinforcements arrived, the enemy would flee. The emperor was full of praise for his idea.

In his term, Xu transferred Gao Gong and Zhang Juzheng into the Grand Secretariat. Also, at one point Hai Rui criticized the Jiajing Emperor on an inappropriate occasion, and was sentenced to death. Xu managed to dissuade the emperor and saved Hai Rui. After the death of the Jiajing Emperor, Xu drafted the testamentary edict of the emperor to say that all the imperial rituals, construction, jewellery and textiles that had been required before were no longer needed. Moreover, he declared that the punishments of the Great Rites Controversy should be reversed.

Political struggle with Yan Song 
As Xu entered the Grand Secretariat, the heated political struggle between him and Yan Song began. The Jiajing Emperor privileged Xu, but nurtured the distaste at the outset. Yan stressed Xu was disloyal before the emperor, made Xu's position untenable. Xu salvaged the situation with his great talent in qingci (green poetry; a special poetry for prayer in the Taoist ceremony written on a green paper), which delighted the emperor devout to Taoism. Xu was regarded as a schemer even in the official biography.  Once Yan Song learned that Qiu Luan, a frontier official friendly with Xu, was convicted of crimes, Yan had intended to implicate Xu in this case. However, astonished to find out the telltale was Xu himself, he had to drop the plan.

The emperor wanted to renovate a palace where he used to live that was destroyed in a fire. He told Yan Song of his intention, but was dissatisfied over Yan Song's suggestion to move back into the Forbidden City. The emperor then turned to Xu, who assured the reconstruction would be finished within several months, supervised by himself. Xu was deemed to be the closest adviser to the emperor instead of Yan ever since. Fearing retaliation in the future, Yan Song hosted a banquet for Xu Jie where his family prostrated themselves before Xu while Yan himself toasted and begged Xu to care for his family if he died some day. Nonetheless, Xu Jie eventually plotted Yan Song's downfall, causing the Yan family to be exiled and Yan's son Yan Shifan to be executed.

Retired life 
Xu retired and returned to his hometown in the summer of 1568. His prestige gave his family members and retainers the freedom to make trouble there without fear of retribution. The arable land they encroached measured up to 240,000 mu (equivalent of about 33600 acre or 136 km2), which had come to Hai Rui's notice. Hai's uncompromising enforcement enraged Xu. So he bribed a censor to impeach Hai.

Notes

References 

 

1503 births
1583 deaths
Senior Grand Secretaries of the Ming dynasty